Believer Book Award is an American literary award presented yearly by The Believer magazine to novels and story collections, nonfiction books or essay collections, poetry collections, and, beginning in 2021 (awarding to books published in 2020), works of graphic narrative the magazine's editors thought were the "strongest and most under-appreciated" of the year. A shortlist and longlist are announced for each genre, along with reader's favorites, then a final winner is selected by the magazine's editors. The inaugural award was in 2005 for books published in 2004.

Winners and shortlist
The year below denotes when the books were published; the award is announced the following year. Thus below, the inaugural 2004 books were announced in early to mid-2005.

Winners are listed first, highlighted in boldface, and indicated with a double dagger

2004
The shortlist was announced in February 2005. The winner was announced in March 2005.
Sam Lipsyte, Home Land
Michelle de Kretser, The Hamilton Case
Lucy Ellmann, Dot in the Universe
Selah Saterstrom, The Pink Institution
Francisco Goldman, The Divine Husband

2005
The shortlist was announced in February 2006. The winner was announced in March 2006.
Sesshu Foster, Atomik Aztex
Trinie Dalton, Wide Eyed
Aimee Bender, Willful Creatures
John Wray, Canaan's Tongue
Tom Bissell, God Lives in St. Petersburg

2006
The winner, and reader survey of best books, was announced in May 2007.
Cormac McCarthy, The Road
 Reader and writer survey of best books.

2007
The shortlist was announced in May 2008. The winner was announced in June 2008.
 Tom McCarthy, Remainder
 Jesse Ball, Samedi the Deafness
 Gerard Donovan, Sunless
 Steve Erickson, Zeroville
 Elizabeth Hand, Generation Loss
 Alain Mabanckou, African Psycho
 Miranda Mellis, The Revisionist
 Lydie Salvayre, The Power of Flies
 Selah Saterstrom, The Meat and Spirit Plan
 Joe Weisberg, An Ordinary Spy

2008
The shortlist was announced in February 2009. The winner was announced in March 2009.
Emily Perkins, Novel About My Wife
Samantha Hunt, The Invention of Everything Else
Mary Ruefle, The Most of It
John Olson, Souls of Wind
Jim Krusoe, Girl Factory
Tod Wodicka, All Shall Be Well; And All Shall Be Well; and All Manner of Things Shall Be Well
Toby Olson, Tampico
Shannon Burke, Black Flies

2009
The shortlist was announced in March 2010. The winner was announced in May 2010.
Percival Everett, I Am Not Sidney Poitier
Christopher Miller, The Cardboard Universe: A Guide to the World of Phoebus K. Dank
Mary Robison, One D.O.A., One on the Way
Blake Butler, Scorch Atlas
Padgett Powell, The Interrogative Mood

2010
The shortlist was announced in March 2011. The winner was announced in May 2011.
James Hynes, Next
Danielle Dutton, Sprawl
Kira Henehan, Orion You Came and You Took All My Marbles
Grace Krilanovich, The Orange Eats Creeps
Paul Murray, Skippy Dies

2011
The shortlist was announced in March 2012. The winner was announced in May 2012.
Ben Lerner, Leaving the Atocha Station
Jesse Ball, The Curfew
Helen DeWitt, Lightning Rods
Lars Iyer, Spurious
Michelle Latiolais, Widow

2012
The shortlist was announced in March 2013. The winner was announced in April 2013.
Tamara Faith Berger, Maidenhead
Barbara Browning, I'm Trying to Reach You
Karl Ove Knausgaard, My Struggle (Book One)
Jim Krusoe, Parsifal
Sergio De La Pava, A Naked Singularity

2013
The shortlist was announced in March 2014. The winner was announced in April 2014.
Rebecca Lee, Bobcat and Other Stories
Kiese Laymon, Long Division
Fiona Maazel, Woke Up Lonely
Keith Ridgway, Hawthorn and Child
Bennett Sims, A Questionable Shape

2014
The shortlist was announced in March 2015. The winner was announced in the Fall 2015 issue.
Ottessa Moshfegh, McGlue
Diane Cook, Man V. Nature
Valeria Luiselli, Faces in the Crowd
Elizabeth McCracken, Thunderstruck and Other Stories
Antoine Volodine, Writers

2017
The shortlist was announced in March 2018. The winner was announced in June 2018.

Matthew Rohrer, The Others 
 Andrew Durbin, MacArthur Park 
 Deepak Unnikrishnan, Temporary People
 Jenny Zhang, Sour Heart
 Leyna Krow, I’m Fine, But You Appear to Be Sinking

2018
The longlist was announced in January 2019. The shortlist and winner was announced in April 2019.

 Rita Bullwinkel, Belly Up 
 Mathias Énard, Tell Them of Battles, Kings, and Elephants
 Ben Passmore, Your Black Friend and Other Strangers
 Shelley Jackson, Riddance; Or: The Sybil Joines Vocational School for Ghost Speakers & Hearing-Mouth Children
 Hideo Yokoyama, translated by Louise Heal Kawai, Seventeen

2019
The longlist was announced on January 15 2020. The shortlist and winner was announced in March 2020. 

Fiction
 Ebony Flowers, Hot Comb
 Sarah Rose Etter, The Book of X
 Adam Ehrlich Sachs, The Organs of Sense
 Donatella Di Pietrantonio, translated by Ann Goldstein, A Girl Returned
 Hebe Uhart, translated by Maureen Shaughnessy, The Scent of Buenos Aires

Nonfiction 
 Trisha Low, Socialist Realism (Coffee House Press)
 Keum Suk Gendry-Kim, translated by Janet Hong, Grass (Drawn & Quarterly)
 Andrea Long Chu, Females (Verso Books)
 Emmanuel Carrère, translated by John Lambert, 97,196 Words (Farrar, Straus and Giroux)
 Heather Christle, The Crying Book (Catapult Books)

Poetry 
 Deborah Landau, Soft Targets (Copper Canyon Press)
 Cameron Awkward-Rich, Dispatch (Persea Books)
 Christopher Kondrich, Valuing (University of Georgia Press)
 Steve Healey, Safe Houses I Have Known (Coffee House Press)
 Franny Choi, Soft Science (Alice James Books)

2020
The longlist was announced on January 15, 2021. The shortlist and winners were announced May 18, 2021. 

Fiction
 Vigdis Hjorth, translated by Charlotte Barslund, Long Live the Post Horn! (Verso Books)
 What Happens at Night by Peter Cameron
 The White Dress by Nathalie Léger (translated by Natasha Lehrer)
 Lisa Robertson, The Baudelaire Fractal
 Souvankham Thammavongsa, How to Pronounce Knife

Nonfiction
 Ashon T. Crawley, The Lonely Letters (Duke University Press)
 Alysia Li Ying Sawchyn, A Fish Growing Lungs
 Emerson Whitney, Heaven 
 Emily J. Lordi, The Meaning of Soul: Black Music and Resilience since the 1960s
 Namwali Serpell, Stranger Faces

Poetry
Yona Harvey, You Don’t Have to Go to Mars For Love (Four Way Books)
 John Murillo, Kontemporary Amerikan Poetry 
 Noah Falck, Exclusions 
 Candice Wuehle, Death Industrial Complex 
 Tess Taylor, Rift Zone

Graphic Narrative
 Jonathan Hill, Odessa (Oni Press)
 Danny Noble, Shame Pudding: A Graphic Memoir
 Vivian Chong and Georgia Webber, Dancing after TEN
 Lawrence Lindell, From Truth with Truth
 Gipi, translated by Jaime Richards, One Story

See also
Believer Poetry Award

References

External links
Believer Book Award at LibraryThing

Awards established in 2005
Short story awards
American fiction awards
Awards by magazines
The Believer (magazine)